Cyperus berroi is a species of sedge that is native to parts of South America.

See also 
 List of Cyperus species

References 

berroi
Plants described in 1944
Flora of Argentina
Flora of Uruguay